Westminster School Boat Club is a rowing club based on the River Thames at the Embankment, Putney, London.

History
The club is reputedly the oldest rowing club in the world. Anecdotal evidence exists for rowing at Westminster in the 18th century and official records date back to the 'Water Ledger' of 1813. Pink was chosen by Westminster as the School's colour for the rowing match against Eton College of 4 May 1837; before this race, both schools wore blue.

Crews containing boys and girls who attend, or are affiliated to, Westminster School are formed to race at all levels of school rowing. The boat house is also that of the Elizabethan Boat Club, made up of Old Westminsters, who compete in major domestic and international races.

Honours

National Schools' Regatta

Schools' Head of the River Race

Henley Royal Regatta

British champions

See also
Rowing on the River Thames
Westminster School
Schools' Head of the River Race

References

Rowing clubs of the River Thames
Sports clubs established in the 1810s
1813 establishments in England
Westminster School
Rowing clubs in England